The 1931–32 IHL season was the third season of the International Hockey League, a minor professional ice hockey league in the Midwestern and Eastern United States and Canada. Seven teams participated in the league, and the Buffalo Bisons won the championship.

Regular season

Playoffs

External links
Season on hockeydb.com

1931 in ice hockey
1932 in ice hockey